Visitors to The Bahamas must obtain a visa from one of the Bahamian diplomatic missions or British diplomatic missions unless they come from one of the visa exempt countries.

Visa policy map

Visa requirement 
Nationals of the following 120 countries and territories can visit the Bahamas for 3 months without a visa unless otherwise stated:

1 – 8 months for Belgium, Denmark, Greece, Italy, Luxembourg, the Netherlands, 3 months for other states.
2 – 8 months.
3 – 8 months, 3 months for U.S. citizens or nationals residing in Guam, Northern Mariana Islands, American Samoa, Puerto Rico and U.S. Virgin Islands.
4 - including permanent resident card holders who are exempt for a maximum of 30 days.

Holders of diplomatic or official passports issued to nationals of Haiti and holders of diplomatic, official or service passports issued to nationals of Cuba do not require a visa for the Bahamas.

Visa exemption agreement for diplomatic and official passports was signed with  but not yet ratified.

Visa on arrival 
Indian citizens with visa issued by the United States, Canada, United Kingdom or any Schengen Member State can obtain a visa on arrival for a maximum stay of 90 days.

Cruise Ship Passengers
Cruise ship passengers travelling to and returning from the Bahamas are required to obtain visa for entry if their passports are from a country that needs a visa to enter the Bahamas. Both entry and departure must be by a cruise ship.

Visitors statistics

Most visitors arriving to the Bahamas were from the following countries of nationality:

See also

 Visa requirements for Bahamian citizens

References 

Bahamas
Foreign relations of the Bahamas